Another Public Enemy is a 2005 South Korean film and the sequel to Public Enemy.

Plot
Kang Chul-joong (Sol Kyung-gu), a prosecutor for the Seoul District attorney's office, is a unique one. He prefers going directly to the crime scene to reading files, his intuition and guts to logic and reason, and using weapons of force to sitting back watching his men get stabbed by criminals. And now, once again, his gets one of his gut feelings about a particular case, and wastes no time in getting involved in the Myung-sun Foundation case, during which he opening declares war on Han Sang-woo (Jung Joon-ho), the Public Enemy.

Cast
Sol Kyung-gu - Kang Chul-joong
Jung Joon-ho - Han Sang-woo 	
Kang Shin-il  - Kim Shin-il
Park Sang-wook - Kang Suk-shin 
Park Geun-hyung -  Vice President 
Choi Jung-woo - Representative Kim
Uhm Tae-woong - Song Jung-hoon

Awards and nominations
2005 Grand Bell Awards
 Nomination - Best Actor - Sol Kyung-gu
 Nomination - Best Supporting Actor - Kang Shin-il
 Nomination - Best Original Screenplay - Kim Hee-jae

References

External links

See also
 List of Korean-language films
 Cinema of Korea
 Contemporary culture of South Korea

2005 films
South Korean action comedy films
Police detective films
2000s Korean-language films
Films directed by Kang Woo-suk
South Korean sequel films
2000s crime comedy films
2005 comedy films
2000s South Korean films
Cinema Service films
CJ Entertainment films